Scott Racing was a NASCAR Winston Cup Series race team that ran from 1961–1973. It was primarily driven by owner Wendell Scott but Earl Brooks also drove a few races. The team started 499 races with 1 win, 21 top 5s, and 155 top 10s.

References

External links
 

Defunct NASCAR teams

Atlantic Championship teams